Johan Radet (born 24 November 1976) is a French former professional footballer who played as defender. Whilst at Auxerre he helped them win the Coupe de France in both 2003 and 2005, playing in both finals.

In 2007, he was close to be recruited by RC Strasbourg, but the doctor detected a heart anomaly, similar the one Marc-Vivien Foé had. This ultimately forced Radet to retire.

References

External links

1976 births
Living people
People from La Fère
Sportspeople from Aisne
Association football defenders
French footballers
AJ Auxerre players
Ligue 1 players
Footballers from Hauts-de-France